"Advice to a Friend on Choosing a Mistress" is a letter by Benjamin Franklin dated June 25, 1745, in which Franklin counsels a young man about channeling sexual urges.  Due to its licentious nature the letter was not published in collections of Franklin's papers in the United States during the 19th century.  Federal court decisions from the mid- to late- 20th century cited the document as a reason for overturning obscenity laws.

Text
The text begins by advising a young man that a cure for sexual urges is unknown, and the proper solution is to take a wife.  Then, expressing doubts that the intended reader will actually marry, Franklin names several advantages of marriage.  As supplementary advice in case the recipient rejects all previous arguments, Franklin lists eight reasons why an older mistress is preferable to a young one.  Advantages include better conversation, less risk of unwanted pregnancy, and "greater prudence in conducting an intrigue."

According to John Richard Stevens, the unnamed correspondent is a friend of Franklin's named Cadwallader Colden, and it remains unknown whether Franklin was serious or if the letter was ever delivered.  Whether serious or humorous, the letter is frankly sexual:

Censorship
The Mistress letter was not the only document by Franklin that later generations censored.  The bawdy portion of Franklin's writing was accepted during his own era.  Although the Mistress letter was not published during his lifetime, Franklin's public works include an essay called "Fart Proudly".  A passage from his Autobiography describes an unsuccessful attempt to seduce a friend's mistress.  As John Semonche observes in Censoring Sex: A Historical Journey Through American Media, the autobiography was widely read during the 19th century because of its moral lessons, but the passage about the failed seduction was variously altered or deleted entirely.  The Mistress letter was omitted from 19th century publications of Franklin's works, and by some accounts it was singled out for suppression.

This censorship occurred both informally and under law.  The first state to enact obscenity legislation was Vermont in 1821.  During the following decades every state except New Mexico adopted similar laws.  Then the Comstock Act of 1873 made it a federal crime to circulate "obscene, lewd, and/or lascivious" material through the mail.

Although Franklin had mistresses throughout his life (including one still-unknown mistress who bore his only son William Franklin), such circumstances were incompatible with patriotic sensibilities a century afterward.  Amy Beth Werbel opines bluntly:

Citations
By the mid-20th century, United States federal judges were citing the letter in originalist reasoning to overturn obscenity laws.  A Jerome Frank appellate opinion of 1957 named "Advice to a Young Man on Choosing a Mistress" along with "The Speech of Polly Baker" as two examples that would have convicted one of the nation's leading founding fathers on federal obscenity charges if they had been written and mailed under subsequent law.

The most notable of these citations occurred in the United States Supreme Court case, United States v. 12 200-ft. Reels of Film.  In a dissenting opinion, Justice William O. Douglas states:

See also
Censorship in the United States

References

Works by Benjamin Franklin
Censorship in the United States
1745 works
Sexuality and age
Letters (message)
18th-century documents